Évry-Courcouronnes Centre is a RER station in Évry, Essonne, Île-de-France, France. The station was opened in 1975 and is on the Grigny–Corbeil-Essonnes railway. The RER Line D, which is operated by the SNCF, serves the station.

Station Info
Constructed at an altitude of 82 meters above sea level, Évry-Courcouronnes Centre station is at the 7.008 kilometer point of the Grigny–Corbeil-Essonnes railway, in between the stations of Orangis – Bois de l'Épine and Le Bras-de-Fer–Évry-Génopole. In 2014, 8,741,664 people used the station.

Train Services
The following RER D train service serve the station:
Local services (RER D) Orry-la-Ville–Coye – Villiers-le-Bel – Gare de Lyon – Villeneuve-Saint-Georges – Évry–Courcouronnes Centre – Corbeil-Essonnes

References

External links
 
 

Railway stations in Essonne
Réseau Express Régional stations
Railway stations in France opened in 1975